Robert Flynn may refer to:

Robb Flynn (born 1968), American guitarist
Robert J. Flynn (1937–2014), former United States Navy naval flight officer
Robert Flynn (author) (born 1932), American novelist from Texas
Robbie Flynn, fictional character on Hollyoaks
Bobby Flynn (born 1981), Australian musician